The space-grant colleges are educational institutions in the United States that comprise a network of fifty-two consortia formed for the purpose of outer space-related research. Each consortium is based in one of the fifty states, the District of Columbia, or Puerto Rico, and each consists of multiple independent space-grant institutions, with one of the institutions acting as lead.

Similar programs include sea-grant colleges (instituted in 1966) and sun-grant colleges (instituted in 2003).

Objectives
The program claims the following objectives:
 Establish and maintain a national network of universities with interests and capabilities in aeronautics, outer space, and related fields;
 Encourage cooperative programs among universities, the aerospace industry, and federal, state, and local governments;
 Encourage interdisciplinary training, research, and public service programs related to aerospace;
 Recruit and train U.S. citizens, especially women, underrepresented minorities, and persons with disabilities, for careers in aerospace science and technology; and,
 Promote a strong science, mathematics, and technology education base from elementary through secondary levels.

History
The National Space Grant College and Fellowship Program was established in 1988 by the US Congress following the success of similar scholarship opportunities in the oceanic Sea Grant and agricultural Land Grant fields. The catch-all term Space Grant refers back to these previous federal programs. In 1989, the program was given over to NASA, which now administers it in the same way that NOAA administers Sea Grant.

The first meeting of the National Council of Space Grant Directors took place from January 16 to January 19, 1990, at the Johns Hopkins Applied Physics Laboratory in Columbia, Maryland, and the Jet Propulsion Laboratory in La Cañada Flintridge, California.
 In 2011, an effort was made to begin collecting the history of the council.

Programs
Building Leaders for Advancing Science and Technology (BLAST)
BLAST is a three-day summer event that takes place at Virginia's Old Dominion University. This free, STEM-centered event, is available to 8th and 9th graders with a 2.3 GPA or better. BLAST's purpose is to show the students the interesting aspects of STEM to those who are unsure whether they want to be involved in STEM or not.

Nationwide Eclipse Ballooning Project
The NEBP is a high-altitude, balloon launching program.

eXploration Systems and Habitation (X-Hab) 2019 Academic Innovation Challenge
The eXploration Systems and Habitation (X-Hab) challenge seeks better the academic and technological abilities of university students. It utilizes hands-on training in the implementation of space habitats for deep space missions. There is an Advanced Exploration Systems (AES) Division where university students can compete to win awards worth $15,000–50,000 for a functional design that the AES finds useful and, or, interesting.

John Mather Nobel Scholars
Established in 2008, the John Mather Nobel Scholars is a scholarship program open to NASA-Goddard Space Flight. The program provides $3,000 so that a chosen participant can share their research paper with NASA professionals. To be a part of this program, a GPA of 3.5 or higher is necessary along with being a junior or higher.

NASA KSC Higher Education Support Services
The NASA/Kennedy Space Center Higher Education Support Services supports college grade Higher Education competitions. Such competitions entail internships, senior design projects, and selective grants.

National Space Grant Distinguished Service Award
The National Space Grant Distinguished Service Award was created by Josh Simpson and is awarded to students who will have an impact in a STEM field related to NASA’s mission/goals.

Space Grant Support Services
The goal of the Space Grant Support Services is to better the Space Grant network. The Space Grant Support Services supports the Space Grant network in many different ways from an economical view to a public view.

Space Systems Engineering Website
The Space Systems Engineering Website is a free, six-week, online course that allows students to work and learn with NASA's engineers. Course materials will always be accessible and students are able to use the learned resources in any way they please.

Virginia Aerospace Science and Technology Program
The Virginia Aerospace Science and Technology Program is a one week, online, STEM summer program. The program focuses on NASA-related research provided by NASA's STEM professionals.

Virginia Commonwealth STEM Industry Internship Program (CSIIP)
The Virginia Commonwealth STEM Industry Internship Program or CSIIP, provides an online internship application system for STEM majors. This was done for the people to meet the increasing demand for citizens with STEM majors.

Virginia Earth System Science Scholars
The Virginia Earth System Science Scholars is a STEM-centered program where participants participate with NASA's professional researchers. The Virginia Space Coast Scholars (VSCS) program is an online, week long, STEM-centered program that focuses on the study of NASA's missions.

William A Hiscock Space Grant Scholarship Fund
The William A Hiscock Space Grant Scholarship Fund was created "in memory of William Hiscock, the former director of the Montana Space Grant." Due to his efforts, many NASA ballooning centered programs were created.

Participating institutions
As of 2002, there are over 850 participating institutions.

Alabama Space Grant Consortium

 University of Alabama in Huntsville, lead institution
 Auburn University
 University of Alabama
 University of Alabama at Birmingham 

 University of South Alabama
 Alabama A&M University
 Tuskegee University

Alaska Space Grant Consortium

 University of Alaska Fairbanks, lead institution
 Alaska Pacific University

 University of Alaska Anchorage
 University of Alaska Southeast

Arizona Space Grant Consortium

 University of Arizona, lead institution
 Arizona State University
 Northern Arizona University
 Embry-Riddle Aeronautical University
 USGS Flagstaff Branch
 World View Enterprises
 Arizona Daily Star
 Arizona Daily Sun
 Arizona Near Space Research
 Biosphere 2
 Central Arizona College
 Coconino Community College
 Diné College
 Estrella Mountain Community College
 Flandrau Science Center and Planetarium
 Glendale Community College
 Iridium Satellite Communications

 Lowell Observatory
 Mt. Lemmon SkyCenter and Sky School
 National Optical Astronomy Observatory (NOAO)
 National Undergraduate Research Observatory (NURO)
 Northern Arizona Planetary Science Alliance (NAPSA)
 Northrop Grumman
 Paragon Space Development Corporation
 Phoenix College
 Pima Community College
 Planetary Science Institute
 Prescott Astronomy Club
 Raytheon Corporation
 Rincon Research
 Tohono O'odham Community College
 USDA ARS Southwest Watershed Research Center

Arkansas Space Grant Consortium

 University of Arkansas at Little Rock, lead institution
 Arkansas State University, Jonesboro
 Arkansas Tech University, Russellville
 Harding University, Searcy
 Henderson State University, Arkadelphia
 Hendrix College, Conway
 John Brown University
 Lyon College, Batesville
 Ouachita Baptist University, Arkadelphia
 Southern Arkansas University, Magnolia
 University of Arkansas, Fayetteville
 University of Arkansas at Fort Smith
 University of Arkansas for Medical Sciences

 University of Arkansas at Monticello
 University of Arkansas at Pine Bluff
 University of Central Arkansas
 University of the Ozarks
 Arkansas Aerospace Training Consortium
 Arkansas Aviation Historical Society
 Arkansas Department of Aeronautics
 Arkansas Economic Development Commission
 Arkansas Department of Education
 Arkansas Department of Higher Education
 BEI Precision
 Civil Air Patrol, Arkansas Wing
 Conestoga-Rovers & Associates

California Space Grant Consortium

 Astronomical Society of the Pacific
 Azusa Pacific University
 California State Polytechnic University, Pomona
 California Polytechnic State University
 California Institute of Technology
 California State University, Sacramento
 California State University, San Bernardino
 California State University, Long Beach
 California State University, Los Angeles
 Pomona College
 San Diego State University
 San Jose State University

 Santa Clara University
 Sonoma State University
 Stanford University
 UC Berkeley
 UC Davis
 UC Irvine
 UC Los Angeles
 UC Riverside
 UC San Diego, lead institution
 UC Santa Barbara
 UC Santa Cruz
 University of San Diego
 University of Southern California

Colorado Space Grant Consortium

 University of Colorado Boulder, lead institution
 Adams State University
 Aims Community College
 Colorado Mesa University
 Colorado School of Mines
 Colorado State University
 Colorado State University - Pueblo
 University of Denver
 Community College of Aurora
 Community College of Denver
 Fort Lewis College

 Front Range Community College
 Otero College
 Metropolitan State University of Denver
 Pikes Peak State College
 Pueblo Community College
 Red Rocks Community College
 Space Foundation
 Trinidad State College
 University of Colorado at Colorado Springs
 University of Northern Colorado
 Western State Colorado University

Connecticut Space Grant Consortium

 University of Hartford, lead institution
 Asnuntuck Community College
 Capital Community College
 Housatonic Community College
 Manchester Community College
 Middlesex Community College
 Naugatuck Valley Community College
 Northwestern Connecticut Community College
 Norwalk Community College
 Quinebaug Valley Community College
 Three Rivers Community College
 Tunxis Community College
 Central Connecticut State University

 Eastern Connecticut State University
 Fairfield University
 Southern Connecticut State University
 Trinity College
 University of Bridgeport
 University of Connecticut
 University of New Haven
 Wesleyan University
 Yale University
 Connecticut Invention Convention
 New England Air Museum
 Connecticut Science Center
 Discovery Museum

Delaware Space Grant Consortium

 University of Delaware, lead institution
 Delaware Technical Community College - Jack F. Owens Campus
 Delaware Technical Community College - Stanton Campus
 Delaware Technical Community College - Terry Campus
 Delaware Technical Community College - George Campus

 Wesley College
 Wilmington University

Florida Space Grant Consortium

 Astronauts Memorial Foundation
 Bethune-Cookman University
 Broward College
 Eastern Florida State College
 Eckerd College
 Embry–Riddle Aeronautical University
 Florida A&M University
 Florida Atlantic University
 Florida Gulf Coast University
 Florida Institute of Technology
 Florida International University

 Florida Polytechnic University
 Florida State University
 Kennedy Space Center
 Orlando Science Center
 Space Florida
 University of Central Florida, lead institution
 University of Florida
 University of Miami
 University of North Florida
 University of South Florida
 University of West Florida

Georgia Space Grant Consortium

 Georgia Institute of Technology, lead institution
 Albany State University
 Agnes Scott College
 Clark Atlanta University
 Columbus State University
 Fort Valley State University
 Generation Orbit Launch Services, Inc.
 Georgia Southern University
 Georgia Southern University - Armstrong Campus
 Georgia State University
 Kennesaw State University

 Mercer University
 Morehouse College
 Museum of Aviation
 Savannah State University
 SpaceWorks Enterprises, Inc.
 Spelman College
 University of Georgia
 University of Georgia - Griffin Campus
 University of North Georgia
 University of West Georgia

Hawai'i Space Grant Consortium

 University of Hawai‘i at Mānoa, lead institution
 University of Hawai‘i at Hilo
 Hawai‘i Community College
 Honolulu Community College
 Kapi‘olani Community College

 Kaua‘i Community College
 Leeward Community College
 University of Hawai'i Maui College
 Windward Community College
 University of Guam

Idaho Space Grant Consortium

 University of Idaho, lead institution
 Boise State University
 Brigham Young University - Idaho
 Bruneau Dunes State Park
 College of Southern Idaho
 College of Western Idaho
 Craters of the Moon National Monument
 Discovery Center of Idaho
 Eastern Idaho Engineering Council
 Idaho Academy of Science and Engineering
 Idaho Department of Education
 Idaho Museum of Natural History

 Idaho National Laboratory
 Idaho Out-of-School Network
 Idaho Science Teachers Association
 Idaho State University
 Idaho STEM Action Center
 Idaho Transportation Department - Division of Aeronautics
 Lewis-Clark State College
 North Idaho College
 Northwest Nazarene University
 Palouse Discovery Center
 The College of Idaho
 University of Idaho

Illinois Space Grant Consortium

 University of Illinois Urbana–Champaign, lead institution
 Adler Planetarium
 Bradley University
 Chicago State University
 City Colleges of Chicago
 DePaul University
 Discovery Center Museum

 Illinois Institute of Technology
 Northern Illinois University
 Northwestern University
 Southern Illinois University Edwardsville
 University of Chicago
 University of Illinois Chicago

Indiana Space Grant Consortium

 Purdue University, lead Institution
 Ball State University
 Anderson University
 Challenger Learning Center
 Children's Museum Indianapolis
 Conner Prairie
 Evansville Museum
 Ethos Science Center
 Indiana University
 Indiana State Museum
 Indiana State University
 Indiana University Bloomington
 Indiana University–Purdue University Columbus

 Indiana University–Purdue University Indianapolis
 NearSpace Launch Inc.
 Purdue University Fort Wayne
 Purdue University Northwest
 Science Central
 StratoStar Project Based STEM Learning
 Taylor University
 Terre Haute Children's Museum
 Trine University
 University of Evansville
 University of Southern Indiana
 Valparaiso University

Iowa Space Grant Consortium

 Iowa State University, lead institution
 Aerodyne Labs
 Ames Laboratory
 Collins Aerospace
 Des Moines Area Community College
 Grout Museum District
 Iowa Academy of Science
 Iowa Aviation Promotion Group, Inc.
 Iowa Department of Education
 Iowa DOT - Aviation Bureau

 ISU Extension and Outreach 4-H Youth Development
 Loras College
 National Lab for Agriculture and the Environment
 National Mississippi River Museum and Aquarium
 Putnam Museum
 Science Center of Iowa
 Softronics, Ltd.
 University of Iowa
 University of Northern Iowa
 Drake University

Kansas Space Grant Consortium

 Wichita State University, lead institution
 Emporia State University
 Fort Hays State University
 Haskell Indian Nations University

 Kansas Cosmosphere and Space Center
 Kansas State University
 Pittsburg State University
 University of Kansas

Kentucky Space Grant Consortium

 University of Kentucky College of Engineering, lead institution
 Asbury University
 Ashland Community and Technical College
 Aviation Museum of Kentucky
 Bellarmine University
 Berea College
 Bluegrass Community and Technical College
 Centre College
 Eastern Kentucky University
 Faradine Systems
 Global Parametrics
 Hopkinsville Community College
 Innoviator, LLC
 Kentucky Science & Technology Corp

 Kentucky Science Center
 Kentucky State University
 The Living Arts and Science Center
 Morehead State University
 Murray State University
 Northern Kentucky University
 Owensboro Community and Technical College
 Space Tango
 Thomas More University
 Tribo Flow Separations, LLC
 University of Louisville
 University of Pikeville
 West Kentucky Community and Technical 
 Western Kentucky University

Louisiana Space Grant Consortium

 Louisiana State University, lead institution
 Baton Rouge Community College
 BREC/Highland Road Park Observatory
 Delgado Community College
 Dillard University
 Gordon A. Cain Center for STEM Literacy
 Grambling State University and A & M College
 Louisiana Business Technology Center
 Louisiana Board of Elementary and Secondary Education
 Louisiana Board of Regents
 Louisiana Public Broadcasting
 Louisiana State University - Alexandria
 Louisiana State University Agricultural Center
 Louisiana State University Health Sciences Center at Shreveport
 Louisiana State University in Shreveport
 Louisiana Tech University

 Loyola University
 McNeese State University
 Nicholls State University
 Northshore Technical Community College
 Northwestern State University of Louisiana
 Nunez Community College
 River Parishes Community College
 SciPort Discovery Center
 Southeastern Louisiana University
 Southern University and A & M College
 Southern University at New Orleans
 Tulane University
 University of Louisiana at Lafayette
 University of Louisiana at Monroe
 University of New Orleans
 Xavier University of Louisiana

Maine Space Grant Consortium

 Maine Space Grant Consortium, lead institution
 University of Maine
 Bates College
 Bigelow Laboratory for Ocean Sciences
 BluShift Aerospace
 Bowdoin College
 Challenger Learning Center of Maine
 Colby College
 Island Institute
 Fryeburg Academy
 Gulf of Maine Research Institute
 Lockheed Martin

 Maine Department of Education
 Maine Manufacturing Extension Partnership
 Maine Maritime Academy
 Maine Mathematics and Science Alliance
 Maine School of Science and Mathematics
 Northern Maine Museum of Science
 Saint Joseph's College of Maine
 Southern Maine Community College
 University of New England
 University of Southern Maine
 VALT Enterprises, LLC
 York County Community College

Maryland Space Grant Consortium

 Johns Hopkins University, lead institution
 Capitol Technology University
 Hagerstown Community College
 The Johns Hopkins University Applied Physics Laboratory
 Morgan State University
 National Center for Earth & Space Science Education

 The Space Telescope Science Institute
 Towson University
 United States Naval Academy
 University of Maryland, Baltimore County
 University of Maryland, College Park
 University of Maryland Eastern Shore

Massachusetts Space Grant Consortium

 Massachusetts Institute of Technology, lead institution
 Boston Museum of Science
 Boston University
 Bridgewater State University
 Five College Astronomy Department
 Framingham State University
 Franklin W. Olin College of Engineering
 Harvard University
 Maria Mitchell Observatory
 Christa McAuliffe Center for Integrated Science Learning
 Mount Holyoke College

 Northeastern University
 Roxbury Community College
 Tufts University
 University of Massachusetts
 University of Massachusetts Dartmouth
 University of Massachusetts Lowell
 Wellesley College
 Williams College
 Worcester Polytechnic Institute
 Worcester State University

Michigan Space Grant Consortium

 University of Michigan, lead institution
 Calvin University
 Eastern Michigan University
 Grand Valley State University
 Hope College
 Michigan State University

 Michigan Technological University
 Oakland University
 Saginaw Valley State University
 Wayne State University
 Western Michigan University
 Ann Arbor Public Schools

Minnesota Space Grant Consortium

 University of Minnesota, lead institution
 Augsburg University
 Bemidji State University
 Bethel University
 Carleton College
 Concordia College
 Fond du Lac Tribal and Community College

 Leech Lake Tribal College
 Macalester College
 Minnesota Dept. of Transportation – Office of Aeronautics
 St. Catherine University
 Southwest Minnesota State University
 University of Minnesota – Duluth
 University of St. Thomas

Mississippi Space Grant Consortium

 University of Mississippi, lead institution
 Alcorn State University
 Coahoma Community College
 Delta State University
 Hinds Community College
 Itawamba Community College
 Jackson State University
 Jones County Junior College
 Mississippi State University

 Meridian Community College
 Mississippi Delta Community College
 Mississippi Gulf Coast Community College
 Northeast Mississippi Community College
 Mississippi University for Women
 Mississippi Valley State University
 University of Southern Mississippi
 Pearl River Community College

Missouri Space Grant Consortium

 Missouri University of Science and Technology, lead institution
 Challenger Learning Center of St. Louis
 Lincoln University 
 Missouri State University
 St Louis University

 Truman State University
 University of Missouri
 University of Missouri–Kansas City
 University of Missouri–St. Louis
 Washington University in St. Louis

Montana Space Grant Consortium

 Aaniiih Nakoda College
 Anasphere, Inc.
 Blackfeet Community College
 Carroll College
 Chief Dull Knife College
 Montana Science Center
 Dawson Community College
 Flathead Valley Community College
 Fort Peck Community College
 Gallatin College
 Great Falls College MSU
 Helena College - UM
 HOPA Mountain, Inc.
 Little Big Horn College
 Miles Community College

 Missoula College
 Montana 4-H Foundation
 Montana Learning Center
 Montana State University Billings
 Montana State University Bozeman, lead institution
 Montana State University Northern
 Montana Tech of the University of Montana
 Museum of the Rockies
 Rocky Mountain College
 Salish Kootenai College
 Stone Child College
 University of Providence
 University of Montana - Missoula
 University of Montana - Western

Nebraska Space Grant Consortium

 University of Nebraska Omaha, lead institution
 CALMIT
 Chadron State College
 Civil Air Patrol - 99th Pursuit Squadron
 College of Saint Mary
 Creighton University
 Great Plains Girl Scouts
 Hastings College
 Metropolitan Community College
 Nebraska Academy of Sciences

 Nebraska Aviation Council
 Nebraska Department of Aeronautics
 Nebraska Department of Education
 Nebraska 4-H
 Nebraska Indian Community College
 University of Nebraska at Kearney
 University of Nebraska-Lincoln
 University of Nebraska Medical Center
 Western Nebraska Community College

Nevada Space Grant Consortium

 Desert Research Institute, lead institution
 DRI - Sciencealive
 Abaris Training Resources
 Challenger Learning Center of Northern Nevada
 College of Southern Nevada
 Digital Solid State Propulsion
 Fleischmann Planetarium & Science Center
 Great Basin College
 Jack C. Davis Observatory

 Nevada State College
 The Planetarium at CSN
 Sustainable Grounding Systems
 Truckee Meadows Community College
 University of Nevada - Las Vegas
 University of Nevada - Reno
 University and Community College System of Nevada
 Western Nevada College

New Hampshire Space Grant Consortium

 University of New Hampshire, lead institution
 BAE Systems
 Great Bay Community College - Portsmouth
 Great Bay Community College - Rochester
 Dartmouth College
 Lakes Region Community College - Laconia
 Manchester Community College
 McAuliffe-Shepard Discovery Center

 Mount Washington Observatory
 Nashua Community College
 NHTI, Concord's Community College
 Plymouth State University
 River Valley Community College - Lebanon
 River Valley Community College - Claremont
 River Valley Community College - Keene
 White Mountains Community College

New Jersey Space Grant Consortium

 Rutgers University - New Brunswick, lead institution
 Bloomfield College
 Brookdale Community College
 The College of New Jersey
 Essex County College
 Federal Aviation Administration, William J. Hughes Technical Center
 Georgian Court University
 Goddard Institute for Space Studies
 Liberty Science Center
 Middlesex County College
 Montclair State University
 New Jersey City University
 New Jersey Institute of Technology

 Princeton University
 Princeton University Plasma Physics Laboratory
 Ramapo College
 Raritan Valley Community College
 Rowan University
 Rutgers University-Camden
 Rutgers University-Newark
 Seton Hall University
 Stevens Institute of Technology
 Stockton University
 Union County College
 William Paterson University

New Mexico Space Grant Consortium

 New Mexico State University, lead institution
 American Institute of Aeronautics and Astronautics
 Air Force Research Laboratory
 Arrowhead Center
 Blue Origin
 Boeing
 BRPH
 Center of Excellence for Commercial Space Transportation
 Central New Mexico Community College
 Colorado Air and Space Port
 Doña Ana Community College
 Federal Aviation Administration

 Fisher Space Pen
 Highlands University
 Jacobs
 Lockheed Martin
 New Mexico Institute of Mining and Technology
 Northrop Grumman
 Southwestern Indian Polytechnic Institute
 Space News
 Special Aerospace Services
 University of New Mexico
 Virgin Galactic

New York Space Grant Consortium

 Cornell University, lead institution
 Alfred University
 Barnard College
 Binghamton University
 City College of New York
 Clarkson University
 Colgate University
 Columbia University
 Cosmoptera, Inc.
 Intrepid Sea, Air & Space Museum
 Lockheed Martin
 Medgar Evers College
 Moog Inc.

 New York University Tandon School of Engineering
 Rensselaer Polytechnic Institute
 Rochester Institute of Technology
 Sciencenter
 SUNY Geneseo
 Stony Brook University
 Syracuse University
 Union College
 University at Buffalo
 University of Rochester
 Ursa Space Systems
 York College

North Carolina Space Grant Consortium

 North Carolina State University

North Dakota Space Grant Consortium

 University of North Dakota, lead institution
 Bismarck State College
 Cankdeska Cikana Community College
 Dakota College at Bottineau
 Dickinson State University
 Gateway To Science
 Lake Region State College
 Mayville State University
 Minot State University

 North Dakota State College of Science
 North Dakota State University
 Nueta Hidatsa Sahnish College
 Sitting Bull College
 State Historical Society of North Dakota
 Turtle Mountain Community College
 United Tribes Technical College
 Valley City State University
 Williston State College

Ohio Space Grant Consortium 

 Ohio Northern University, lead institution
 Ohio Aerospace Institute
 Baldwin Wallace University
 Case Western Reserve University
 Cedarville University
 Central State University
 The Cincinnati Observatory
 Cincinnati State Technical and Community College
 Cleveland State University
 Columbus State Community College
 Cuyahoga Community College
 Drake Planetarium and Science Center
 iSpace
 Kent State University
 Lakeland Community College

 Lorain County Community College
 Marietta College
 Miami University
 NASA Glenn Research Center
 Ohio University
 Ohio State University
 Sinclair Community College
 University of Akron
 University of Toledo
 University of Cincinnati
 University of Dayton
 University of Toledo
 Wright State University
 Wilberforce University
 Youngstown State University

Oklahoma Space Grant Consortium

 Oklahoma State University–Stillwater, lead institution
 Cameron University
 Center for Spatial Analysis
 East Central University
 Frontier Electronic Systems Corp
 Langston University
 Norman Economic Development Center
 Redlands Community College

 Science Applications International Corp
 Southeastern Oklahoma State University
 Southern Nazarene University
 Southwestern Oklahoma State University
 Stafford Air and Space Museum
 STARBASE Oklahoma
 Tulsa Community College
 University of Oklahoma

Oregon Space Grant Consortium

 Oregon State University, lead institution
 Eastern Oregon University
 Evergreen Aviation & Space Museum
 George Fox University
 Lane Community College
 Linn Benton Community College
 The Museum at Warm Springs
 Oregon Coast Community College
 Oregon Institute of Technology

 Oregon Museum of Science and Industry
 Pacific University
 Portland Community College
 Portland State University
 Southern Oregon University
 Southwestern Oregon Community College
 University of Oregon
 University of Portland
 Western Oregon University

Pennsylvania Space Grant Consortium

 Pennsylvania State University, lead institution
 California University of Pennsylvania
 Carnegie Mellon University
 Cheyney University
 Drexel University
 Franklin & Marshall College
 Gannon University
 Gettysburg College
 Lehigh University
 Lincoln University

 Montgomery County Community College
 NASTAR Center
 Penn State Abington
 University of Pittsburgh
 Swarthmore College
 Temple University
 Villanova University
 West Chester University

Puerto Rico Space Grant Consortium

 University of Puerto Rico, lead institution
 Ana G. Méndez University System
 Arecibo Observatory
 EcoExploratorium
 Interamerican University of Puerto Rico at Bayamón
 Polytechnic University Puerto Rico

 Puerto Rico Astronomy Society
 Puerto Rico Department of Education
 Puerto Rico NASA Explorer School
 RUM Planetarium
 StarBase Puerto Rico

Rhode Island Space Grant Consortium 

 Brown University, lead institution
 Bryant University
 Community College of Rhode Island
 Providence College
 Roger Williams Park Museum of Natural History and Planetarium
 Roger Williams University
 Rhode Island College
 Rhode Island School of Design

 Salve Regina University
 University of Rhode Island
 Wheaton College
 Rhode Island Aviation and Space Education Council
 NASA Educators Resource Center
 Northeast Planetary Data Center
 LADD Observatory

South Carolina Space Grant Consortium

 College of Charleston

South Dakota Space Grant Consortium

 South Dakota School of Mines and Technology, lead institution
 Augustana University
 Badlands Observatory
 Black Hills Astronomical Society
 Black Hills State University
 Dakota State University
 The Journey Museum and Learning Center
 Lake Area Technical Institute
 Missouri Breaks Industries Research, Inc.
 Northern State University
 Oglala Lakota College
 Raven Industries

 RESPEC
 Sanford Underground Research Facility
 Sinte Gleska University
 South Dakota Air & Space Museum
 South Dakota Board of Regents
 South Dakota Discovery Center
 South Dakota State Library
 South Dakota State University
 University of South Dakota
 USGS Center for Earth Resources Observation and Science
 Washington Pavilion / Kirby Science Discovery Center

Tennessee Space Grant Consortium

 Vanderbilt University, lead institution
 Austin Peay State University
 East Tennessee State University
 Middle Tennessee State University

 Oak Ridge Associated Universities
 Rhodes College
 Tennessee Technological University
 University of Tennessee at Chattanooga

Texas Space Grant Consortium

Academic Members
 Angelo State University
 Austin Community College District
 Baylor University
 El Paso Community College
 Houston Community College
 Lamar University
 Laredo College
 Lone Star College System
 McLennan Community College
 Prairie View A&M University
 Rice University
 San Jacinto College
 South Texas College
 Southern Methodist University
 St. Edward's University
 Sul Ross State University
 Tarleton State University
 Texas A&M International University
 Texas A&M University
 Texas A&M University–Commerce
 Texas A&M University–Corpus Christi
 Texas A&M University–Kingsville
 Texas A&M University–Texarkana
 Texas Christian University
 Texas Southern University
 Texas State University
 Texas Tech University
 Texas Woman's University
 Trinity University (Texas)
 University of Dallas
 University of Houston
 University of Houston–Clear Lake
 University of Houston–Downtown
 University of North Texas
 University of St. Thomas (Texas)
 University of Texas Rio Grande Valley
 University of Texas at Arlington
 University of Texas at Austin, lead institution
 University of Texas at Dallas
 University of Texas at El Paso
 University of Texas at San Antonio
 University of Texas at Tyler
 University of Texas Health Science Center at Houston
 University of Texas Health Science Center at San Antonio
 University of Texas Medical Branch
 University of Texas Permian Basin
 University of Texas Southwestern Medical Center

Government Members
 Governor of Texas
 Texas Higher Education Coordinating Board

Industry Members
Lockheed Martin

Non-Profit Members
 Austin Astronomical Society
 Austin Planetarium
 Bob Bullock Texas State History Museum
 Capitol Area Council, Boy Scouts of America
 Don Harrington Discovery Center
 Girlstart
 Rio Grande Valley Science Association
 Scobee Education Center
 Seal of Valor
 SEDS-USA
 Southwest Research Institute
 STEAMSPACE
 Texas Alliance for Minorities in Engineering
 Texas Medical Center
 Universities Space Research Association

Utah Space Grant Consortium
 University of Utah, lead institution
 Brigham Young University
 Utah State University

Vermont Space Grant Consortium

 University of Vermont, lead institution

Virginia Space Grant Consortium

 College of William & Mary
 Hampton University
 Old Dominion University
 University of Virginia
 Virginia Polytechnic Institute and State University

Washington D.C. NASA Space Grant Consortium

 American University

Washington NASA Space Grant Consortium

 University of Washington

West Virginia Space Grant Consortium

 West Virginia University

Wisconsin Space Grant Consortium

 Lawrence University
 University of Wisconsin–Green Bay

Wyoming NASA Space Grant Consortium

 University of Wyoming

See also
Land Grant Colleges
Sea Grant Colleges
Sun Grant Colleges

Notes

External links
 Official website

NASA programs
Lists of universities and colleges in the United States
1988 establishments in the United States